Tamaree Railway Station is a closed railway station on Queensland's North Coast railway line. Nothing remains of the closed station buildings, though a small part of the concrete platform remains in place.

On 18 October 1947 eight people were killed and twenty-two injured in a mail train collision at Tamaree.

References

Disused railway stations in Queensland
North Coast railway line, Queensland